Harold Perry may refer to:

Harold Robert Perry, clergyman
Harold Perry (golfer) in Philadelphia Open Championship
Harry Perry (musician)
Harold Perry of Perrys Motor Sales

See also
Harry Perry (disambiguation)
Hal Perry (disambiguation)